Knudåge Riisager (6 March 1897 in Kunda, Russian Empire – 26 December 1974 in Copenhagen, Denmark) was a Danish composer. His work was part of the music event in the art competition at the 1928 Summer Olympics.

Early life and education
Knudåge Riisager was born in what is today Estonia of Danish parents. His father Emil Riisager was an engineer, and the family returned to Denmark in 1900 when Knudåge was three years old.

He graduated from Copenhagen University where he received violin lessons from Peder Møller, and studied music theory under Otto Malling and Peder Gram. For many years he worked in a government job, and also as a composer. In 1923 he went to Paris to study with Albert Roussel and Paul Le Flem, where he experienced at first hand French neoclassicism and the music of Igor Stravinsky and Les Six. Later he also studied in Leipzig with Hermann Grabner.

Career
Knudåge Riisager's international fame is largely due to his extensive work in ballet music, which was primarily a result of  collaboration with Harald Lander. The first work he composed for the Royal Danish Theatre was music for the ballet Benzin by Storm P. staged by Elna Ørnberg in 1930.

Knudåge Riisager was also an industrious writer: his bibliography includes nearly 400 titles spread over six decades. In 1956–67 he was director of the Royal Danish Academy of Music. His compositions are stored in the Music and Theatre Department at the Royal Danish Library.

He was a commander of the 1st degree in the Dannebrogordenen, and is buried at Tibirkegård.

Music

According to his entry in Grove, "Riisager became the most prominent representative of the French-orientated trend in Danish music of the interwar years". His trumpet concertino (1933) is considered a leading example of Danish neoclassical music.

Notable works 
Opera
Susanne, Op. 49 (1948)
Ballet music
Benzin, Op. 17 (1930)
Cocktails-Party, Op. 19 (1930) (ikke opført)
Darduse, Op. 32 (1935–36)
Tolv med Posten, Op. 37 (1942)
Slaraffenland, Op. 33 (1936–40)
Qarrtsiluni, Op. 36 (1938–42)
Fugl Fønix (1944/45)
Etudes (1947)
Månerenen, Op. 57 (1956)
Fruen fra havet, Op. 59 (1959)
Galla-Variationer (1966)
Ballet Royal (1967)
Svinedrengen (1968)
Film music
Niels Ebbesen (1945)
Revymusik
Paa Hodet, første PH-revy, musik til finalen (1929)
Orchestral music
Erasmus Montanus, Op. 1 (1920)
Suite dionysiaque, Op. 6
Symphony No. 1, Op. 8 (1925)
Variationer over et tema af Mezangeau, Op. 12 (1926)
Symphony No. 2, Op. 14 (1927)
Fastelavn, Op. 20 (1929/30)
Concerto for orchestra, Op. 24 (1931)
Concertino for trumpet and strings, Op. 29 (1933)
Symphony No. 3, Op. 30 (1935)
Symphony No. 4, Op. 38 (Sinfonia gaia) (1939–40)
Symphony No. 5, Op. 52 (Sinfonia serena) (1949–50)
Violin Concerto in A minor, Op. 54 (1950-1951)
Chamber music
Violin Sonata No. 1
Violin Sonata No. 2 (1923)

See also
List of Danish composers

References

External links
 Riisager Bibliografi
 Musik- og Teaterafdelingen på Det Kongelige Bibliotek
 Kraks Blå Bog 1974
This article was initially translated from the Danish Wikipedia.

1897 births
1974 deaths
People from Kunda, Estonia
Danish classical composers
Danish male classical composers
Danish opera composers
Male opera composers
Ballet composers
20th-century classical composers
20th-century Danish male musicians
Olympic competitors in art competitions